Spyridium oligocephalum is a species of flowering plant in the family Rhamnaceae and is endemic to the south-west of Western Australia. There are large, papery, orange-brown stipules joined in pairs at their bases, at the base of the petiole. The flowers are arranged in head-like, condensed cymes on the ends of branchlets.

This species was first formally described in 1858 by Nikolai Turczaninow, who gave it the name Trimalium oligocephalum in the Bulletin de la Société Impériale des Naturalistes de Moscou. In 1863, George Bentham changed the name to Spyridium oligocephalum in Flora Australiensis. The specific epithet (oligocephalum) means "few-headed". 

Spyridium oligocephalum grows in sandy soil on sandplains in the Esperance Plains and Jarrah Forest bioregions of south-western Western Australia. It is listed as "Priority Three" by the Government of Western Australia Department of Biodiversity, Conservation and Attractions, meaning that it is poorly known and known from only a few locations but is not under imminent threat.

References

oligocephalum
Rosales of Australia
Flora of Western Australia
Taxa named by Nikolai Turczaninow
Plants described in 1858